Peter Rannald (died 1609) was a Scottish tailor who worked for Anne of Denmark, the wife of James VI of Scotland.

Career
He was probably a relation of Patrick Rannald, who appears in contemporary records as a bonnet-maker in Edinburgh's Canongate and as a Deacon of the Edinburgh craft of bonnetmakers. Peter Rannald began working for Anne of Denmark in Edinburgh in the summer of 1591, after her Danish tailor Paul Rey returned home. Rannald, and two other Scottish tailors, Peter Sanderson and William Simpson, made clothes for the queen as directed by the Danish master of her wardrobe Søren Jonson. The fabrics were mostly sourced by Robert Jousie, who with his business partner Thomas Foulis, was paid from sums of money given to James VI by Elizabeth I. Surviving records held by the National Archives of Scotland detail the fabrics delivered to Peter Rannald to make the queen's gowns and other garments. 

Rannald also made clothes which the queen gave to her ladies and serving women as gifts and as a trousseau at their marriages. He made clothes for Margaret Vinstarr and a wedding dress of cloth of gold and cloth of silver for Marie Stewart, Countess of Mar.

In September 1591 Peter Rannald made clothes for masque dancing for Anne of Denmark and some of her courtiers. The costumes involved red, white-grey, green, blue, and yellow taffeta, with metallic or tinsel fabrics "tok of gold" and "tok of silver", and six plumes of red and white feathers. The occasion of this masque is not recorded, but other costumed dances can be associated with the weddings of courtiers.

In October 1591 Rannald sewed gold passementerie onto a gown made from grey velvet from Denmark. The fabric was probably sent to Anne by her mother, Sophie of Mecklenburg-Güstrow. In May 1592 he was given London black cloth to make a cloak for himself, and in August 1594 fine black velvet for a garment, perhaps to wear at the baptism of Prince Henry at Stirling Castle.

Another Edinburgh tailor, Nicoll Spence or Spens, had worked with Paul Rey and in 1591 made clothes for Anne of Denmark's Danish gentlewomen, Sophie Kaas and Katrina Skinkell. He had worked for Mary, Queen of Scots, and Margaret Stewart, Mistress of Ochiltree, who became an important figure in the queen's household. When Nicoll Spens died in 1599, Thomas Rannald, hatmaker, and Nicoll Rannald were witnesses to his will. Spens was owed money for making clothes for Dorothea Stewart, Countess of Gowrie, and Marie Ruthven, Countess of Atholl. On 3 April 1603, Thomas Rannald joined the royal household as master hat-maker and haberdasher as the successor of John Hepburn.

Peter Rannald died in 1609. His widow Jonnett Birs petitioned for payment of £1,300 Scots, a sum recorded on a royal precept or order dating from 1595. King James asked for confirmation that such an old debt was still outstanding.

References

Household of Anne of Denmark
16th-century Scottish businesspeople
16th-century fashion
British tailors
Material culture of royal courts
1609 deaths